"Down the Aisle (The Wedding Song)" is a doo-wop ballad recorded and released by girl group Patti LaBelle and the Bluebelles in 1963. The song became a hit success for the Philadelphia-based vocal group following the controversial release of their "debut hit", 1962's "I Sold My Heart to the Junkman".

Background
By 1963, the controversy over the hit song, "I Sold My Heart to the Junkman", which was credited to the Bluebelles singing group but was rumored to be recorded by another group, had died down. Despite getting credit for "Junkman", the group failed to find a follow-up hit with songs such as "Go On" and "Cool Water".
Finally, Newtown released their next single, which is dedicated to a wedding day.

The song is notable for lead singer Patti LaBelle singing in a high whistle register vocal near the end of the song while backed up by her lower-octave singing partners. The group recorded an alternate version that same year.

Credits
Lead vocal by Patti LaBelle
Background vocals by the Bluebelles: Nona Hendryx, Sarah Dash and Cindy Birdsong

Chart performance

The song was one of the first Bluebelles songs to be given massive play on both AM pop and rhythm and blues radio stations. The song later became a favorite for "blue night basement parties" and slow dances. .

Popular culture
The song is heard in the 1995 film, Stonewall

References

1963 singles
Labelle songs
1963 songs
Cameo-Parkway Records singles
Songs about marriage
1960s ballads